Sputoherpia is a genus of cavibelonian solenogaster, shell-less, worm-like, marine  mollusks.

Species
 Sputoherpia exigua Salvini-Plawen, 1978
 Sputoherpia fissitubata Salvini-Plawen, 1978
 Sputoherpia galliciensis Garcia-Álvarez, Urgorri & Salvini-Plawen, 2000
 Sputoherpia laxopharyngeata Salvini-Plawen, 1978
 Sputoherpia megaradulata Salvini-Plawen, 1978

References

 Salvini-Plawen L v. (1978). Antarktische und subantarktische Solenogastres (eine Monographie: 1898-1974). Zoologica (Stuttgart) 128: 1-305
 García-Álvarez O., Salvini-Plawen L.v., Urgorri V. & Troncoso J.S. (2014). Mollusca. Solenogastres, Caudofoveata, Monoplacophora. Fauna Iberica. 38: 1-294.

Solenogastres